Gantulgyn Altanbagana ( born 21 June 1995) is a Mongolian judoka. In 2018, he won the silver medal in the men's 90 kg event at the 2018 Asian Games held in Jakarta, Indonesia.

References

External links
 
 

1995 births
Mongolian male judoka
Asian Games medalists in judo
Judoka at the 2018 Asian Games
Asian Games silver medalists for Mongolia
Medalists at the 2018 Asian Games
Living people
Judoka at the 2020 Summer Olympics
Olympic judoka of Mongolia
20th-century Mongolian people
21st-century Mongolian people